Doheny is an Irish surname. Notable people with the surname include:

Ed Doheny (1873–1916), professional American baseball player
Edward Laurence Doheny (1856–1935), American oil tycoon
Jer Doheny (1874–1929), Irish sportsman
John Doheny (born 1953), American jazz musician
Michael Doheny (1805–1863), Irish writer and politician
Ned Doheny, American singer, songwriter and guitarist

See also

Doheny Eye Institute, a nonprofit ophthalmic research institute.
Doheny Drive, a major north/south thoroughfare of Beverly Hills and West Hollywood, California
Doheny State Beach, a California state park
Doheny Library, on the campus of the University of Southern California
Doheny Plaza, high-rise building in West Hollywood, California.
Greystone Mansion, also known as the Doheny Mansion, Beverly Hills, California
Doheny, one of the two campuses of Mount St. Mary's College, Los Angeles, California
Dohenys GAA, a Gaelic Athletic Association club in Dunmanway, County Cork, Ireland